The Political families of Madhya Pradesh are a group of older families that exert considerable influence throughout the region.

The Singh ( Rajput )Family 

Rao Shiv Bahadur Singh of Churhat thikana was in  the Central cabinet under Pt. Jawaharlal Nehru.
Arjun Singh (Son of Rao Shiv Bahadur Singh) Former Union HRD Minister and Former Chief Minister of Madhya Pradesh 
Ajay Arjun Singh (Son of Arjun Singh) aka Rahul Bhaiya Ex Cabinet Minister MP, Ex Leader of Opposition
 Arunoday Singh (Son of Ajay Singh) Film Actor in Bollywood.

Connected Member
Tin Maharaja Mohan Shamsher Jang Bahadur Rana, former Prime Minister of Nepal 
Usharaje Scindia Daughter ofGwalior King George Jivajirao Scindia
Digvijaya Singh, former Chief Minister of Madhya Pradesh
Awadhesh Pratap Singh, former Prime Minister of Rewa State and First Chief Minister of Vindhya Pradesh
Govind Narayan Singh (Son of Awadesh Pratap Singh) Former Chief Minister of Madhya Pradesh
Dr. Govind Singh Leader of Legislative assembly Madhya Pradesh and Cabinet Minister in MP Govt.

The Scindia Family (former Maharajas) (mother-son and daughters-grandsons) 

Rajmata Vijayraje ScindiaBJP
Madhavrao Scindia, son of Vijayaraje INC
Jyotiraditya Scindia, son of Madhavrao
Vasundhara Raje Scindia, daughter of Vijayaraje
Dushyant Singh, son of Vasundhara Raje
Yashodhara Raje Scindia, daughter of Vijayaraje
Connected Member
Pashupati Shamsher Jang Bahadur Rana, son-in-law of Vijayraje Scindia, ex-minister of Nepal, grandson of Maharaja Mohan Shamsher Jang Bahadur Rana

The Chaturvedi (Chaudhary) family 

 Chaudhary Dilip Singh Chaturvedi, MLA from Bhind  
 Chaudhary Rakesh Singh Chaturvedi (son) former cabinet minister, former leader of opposition, MLA from Bhind 
 Chaudhary Mukesh Singh Chaturvedi (son) MLA from Mehgaon

Connected members

 Ravishankar Shukla, former Chief Minister of Madhya Pradesh
 Shyama Charan Shukla, former Chief Minister of Madhya Pradesh
 Vidya Charan Shukla, minister in Indira Gandhi's cabinet

The Nagori family of Rajasthan State 

Mohd. Anwar Nagori, Son Of Mohd. Ismail Nagori, MLA from Ujjain
Qayyum Nagori, son of Mohd.  Ismail Nagori , Central Minister Deligate from Nagor

Bhuria family 

 Dileep Singh Bhuria, MP from Ratlam
 Nirmala Bhuria, MLA from Petlawad
 Kantilal Bhuria, MP from Ratlam

Chaturvedi family 

Vidyawati Chaturvedi, MLA from  Laundi Vidhan Sabha constituency
Satyavrat Chaturvedi, son of Vidyawati Chaturvedi and MP of Rajya Sabha

Alok Chaturvedi, MLA from Chhatarpur Vidhan Sabha constituency

Nath family 

Kamal Nath, 18th Chief Minister of Madhya Pradesh
Nakul Nath, Member of parliament from Chhindwara
Alka Nath, Ex member of parliament from Chhindwara

Singh family 

 Balbhadra Singh,  MLA from  Vidhan Sabha constituency
 Digvijaya Singh, 15th Chief Minister of Madhya Pradesh
 Jaivardhan Singh, son of MLA from  Vidhan Sabha constituency
 Lakshman Singh,  MLA from  Vidhan Sabha constituency
 Mool Singh, MLA from  Vidhan Sabha constituency and cousin of Lakshman and Digvijaya

Vajpayee family 

 Atal Bihari Vajpayee, 10th Prime Minister of India
 Karuna Shukla,  niece of Atal Bihari, member of the 14th Lok Sabha of India

Madhya Pradesh politicians
Lists of people from Madhya Pradesh